Campbell is a city in Wilkin County, Minnesota, United States. The population was 164 at the 2020 census. It is part of the Wahpeton, ND-MN Micropolitan Statistical Area.

History
Campbell was laid out in 1871. A post office has been in operation at Campbell since 1873.

Geography

Minnesota State Highway 9 serves as a main route in the community.

Demographics

2010 census
As of the census of 2010, there were 158 people, 72 households, and 45 families living in the city. The racial makeup of the city was 98.7% White, 0.6% African American, and 0.6% Native American. Hispanic or Latino of any race were 3.2% of the population.

There were 72 households, of which 26.4% had children under the age of 18 living with them, 52.8% were married couples living together, 6.9% had a female householder with no husband present, 2.8% had a male householder with no wife present, and 37.5% were non-families. 30.6% of all households were made up of individuals, and 5.6% had someone living alone who was 65 years of age or older. The average household size was 2.19 and the average family size was 2.78.

The median age in the city was 48 years. 20.3% of residents were under the age of 18; 6.3% were between the ages of 18 and 24; 17.7% were from 25 to 44; 37.4% were from 45 to 64; and 18.4% were 65 years of age or older. The gender makeup of the city was 50.6% male and 49.4% female.

2000 census
As of the census of 2000, there were 241 people, 95 households, and 60 families living in the city. The racial makeup of the city was 94.19% White, 0.83% African American, 1.66% Native American, 3.32% from other races. Hispanic or Latino of any race were 4.56% of the population.

There were 95 households, out of which 32.6% had children under the age of 18 living with them, 50.5% were married couples living together, 8.4% had a female householder with no husband present, and 36.8% were non-families. 30.5% of all households were made up of individuals, and 10.5% had someone living alone who was 65 years of age or older.  The average household size was 2.54 and the average family size was 3.28.

In the city, the population was spread out, with 31.1% under the age of 18, 7.1% from 18 to 24, 27.0% from 25 to 44, 23.2% from 45 to 64, and 11.6% who were 65 years of age or older.  The median age was 36 years. For every 100 females, there were 106.0 males.  For every 100 females age 18 and over, there were 102.4 males.

The median income for a household in the city was $31,458, and the median income for a family was $37,500. Males had a median income of $27,083 versus $16,250 for females. The per capita income for the city was $15,128.  About 9.7% of families and 14.2% of the population were below the poverty line, including 24.6% of those under the age of eighteen and 5.7% of those 65 or over.

Notable people
Thomas D. Schall, U.S. Representative in Minnesota's 10th District (1915–1925) and U.S. Senator from Minnesota (1925–1935)

Errol Mann, place kicker for the Detroit Lions and Oakland Raiders.

References

External links
 Campbell Photo Gallery

Cities in Minnesota
Cities in Wilkin County, Minnesota
Wahpeton micropolitan area